Buchberger may refer to:

People
 Bruno Buchberger (born 1942), professor of computer mathematics at Johannes Kepler University
 Hubert Buchberger (born 1951), German violinist, conductor and music university teacher
 Kelly Buchberger (born 1966), Canadian professional ice hockey coach and former player
 Kerri Buchberger (born 1970), retired female volleyball player from Canada
 Michael Buchberger (1874–1961), Roman Catholic priest
 Walter Buchberger (1895–1970), Czechoslovak skier of German ethnicity

Other
 Buchberger Leite, a gorge near Hohenau in the Lower Bavarian county of Freyung-Grafenau in Bavaria
 Buchberger's algorithm, a method of transforming a given set of generators for a polynomial ideal into a Gröbner basis with respect to some monomial order